RRHS may refer to:
 Ronald Wilson Reagan College Preparatory High School, Milwaukee, Wisconsin, United States
 Red River High School, Grand Forks, North Dakota, United States
 Rio Rancho High School, Rio Rancho, New Mexico, United States
 Rio Rico High School, Rio Rico, Arizona, United States
 River Ridge High School (disambiguation)
 Roanoke Rapids High School, Roanoke Rapids, North Carolina, United States
 Rocky River High School (North Carolina), Mint Hill, North Carolina, United States
 Rocky River High School (Ohio), Rocky River, Ohio, United States
 Round Rock High School, Round Rock, Texas, United States